Kun Nan "Nani" Dollison (born 1953 in South Korea) is an American professional poker player from Hernando, Mississippi, who is a three-time World Series of Poker bracelet champion.

As of 2010, her total live tournament winnings exceed $775,000. Her eight cashes as the WSOP account for $600,515 of those winnings.

World Series of Poker bracelets

References

External links
 CardPlayer.com article – Nani Dollison
 WissenPoker.com – Nani Dollison profile

1953 births
People from Hernando, Mississippi
Female poker players
American poker players
South Korean poker players
Living people
World Series of Poker bracelet winners